The Kellas cat is a large black cat found in Scotland. It is an interspecific hybrid between the Scottish wildcat (Felis silvestris silvestris syn. Felis silvestris grampia) and the domestic cat (Felis catus). Once thought to be a mythological wild cat, with its few sightings dismissed as hoaxes, a specimen was killed in a snare by a gamekeeper in 1984 and found to be a hybrid between the Scottish wildcat and domestic cat. It is not a formal cat breed, but a landrace of felid hybrids. It is named after the village of Kellas, Moray, where it was first found. The purported first live cat was caught by the Tomorrows World team and featured in the 1986 programme 'On the Trail of the Big Cat'. The historian Charles Thomas speculated that the Pictish stone at Golspie may depict a Kellas cat. The Golspie stone, now held at the Dunrobin Castle Museum, shows a cat-like creature standing on top of a salmon which may allude to the characteristics ascribed to a Kellas cat of catching fish while swimming in the river.

A researcher at the National Museum of Scotland examined eight Kellas cat specimens. One carcass was already in the Museum's collection; the remaining seven were supplied by Di Francis, who is described by Thomas as a "writer, researcher and practical naturalist". He identified one of the animals as a melanistic wildcat; this juvenile male was the first wildcat ever documented as melanistic in Scotland. Most of the other specimens examined were concluded to be hybrids but more closely aligned to the Scottish wildcat; only one hybrid leaned more towards a domestic cat.

A specimen is kept in a museum in Elgin. The Zoology Museum of the University of Aberdeen also holds a mounted specimen that was found during 2002 in the Insch area of Aberdeenshire.

Cat-sìth

The folklore of the cat-sìth may have been inspired by the Kellas cat. The  Cat-sìth is a fairy creature from Celtic mythology, said to resemble a large black cat with a white spot on its chest. Legend has it that the ghostly cat haunts the Scottish Highlands. The legends surrounding this creature are more common in Scottish mythology, but a few occur in Irish mythology.

See also
 British big cats
 Phantom cat

References

Bibliography

Cat breeds originating in Scotland
Cat landraces
Felis
Carnivorans of Europe
Domestic–wild hybrid cats
Moray
Fauna of Scotland
Intraspecific hybrids